Aleksandr Anatolevich Mindadze (born 28 April 1949 in Moscow) is a Russian scriptwriter and director. He has won many of the most important Russian and Soviet film awards.

Selected filmography
Fox Hunting (1980)
Planet Parade (1984)
The Train Has Stopped (1982)
The Servant (1989)
A Play for a Passenger (1995)
Dreaming of Space (2005)

References

External links 
Profile at IMDb

1949 births
Russian film directors
Living people
Russian people of Georgian descent
20th-century Russian screenwriters
21st-century Russian screenwriters
Russian screenwriters
Soviet screenwriters
Recipients of the Order "For Merit to the Fatherland", 4th class
Recipients of the Order of Honour (Russia)
Recipients of the Vasilyev Brothers State Prize of the RSFSR
Recipients of the Nika Award
Gerasimov Institute of Cinematography alumni
Academicians of the National Academy of Motion Picture Arts and Sciences of Russia
Recipients of the USSR State Prize
Recipients of the Lenin Komsomol Prize